Budhi Ram Dubey Mahavidyalay is a degree college for girls, situated in Itahara Uparwar village, Sant Ravidas Nagar District, India. It is affiliated to Mahatma Gandhi Kashi Vidyapeeth.

Subjects 
 Hindi literature
 English literature
 Sanskrit literature
 Social science
 Philosophy
 Pedagogy
 Ancient history

References 
 https://web.archive.org/web/20130403132934/http://mgkvp.ac.in/affiliated/CDetaiDistrictwise.pdf

Women's universities and colleges in Uttar Pradesh
Mahatma Gandhi Kashi Vidyapith
Bhadohi district
Educational institutions established in 2011
2011 establishments in Uttar Pradesh